The 1975 Madrid Tennis Grand Prix, also known as the Trofeo Meliá, was a combined men's and women's tennis tournament played on outdoor clay courts at the Real Sociedad Hípica Española Club de Campo in Madrid, Spain. The men's tournament was classified as Group A category and was part of the 1975 Grand Prix circuit. It was the fourth edition of the tournament and was held from 6 October through 12 October 1975. Jan Kodeš and Heidi Eisterlehner won the singles titles.

Finals

Men's singles
 Jan Kodeš defeated  Adriano Panatta 5–7, 2–6, 7–6, 6–2, 6–3

Women's singles
 Heidi Eisterlehner defeated  Janice Metcalf 2–6, 6–1, 6–1

Men's doubles
 Jan Kodeš /  Ilie Năstase defeated  Juan Gisbert /  Manuel Orantes 7–6, 4–6, 9–7

References

External links
 ITF tournament edition details

Madrid Tennis Grand Prix
Madrid Tennis Grand Prix
Madrid Tennis Grand Prix